The chapters of Gakuen Alice are written and illustrated by Higuchi Tachibana. They are published in the Japanese manga anthology Hana to Yume by Hakusensha and collected in tankōbon.  Twenty-nine volumes have been released as of March 2013. The first was released on February 19, 2003 and the twenty-ninth was published in March 2013.

Gakuen Alice is licensed for an English-language release in North America by Tokyopop. Sixteen  volumes have been published so far.



Volume list

Omakes
Six months after the conclusion of Gakuen Alice, Higuchi published a series of omakes that revealed small revelations of what happened to some of the main characters.

 Mikan and Natsume got married and lived a happy life together.
 Natsume's life span has expanded due to Mikan's Nullification Alice stone being inserted in him.
 Hotaru and Subarau continued to travel through different timelines, but managed to briefly reunite with Mikan.
 Ruka is still in love with Mikan but continues to support Mikan and Natsume's relationship.
 Tsubasa and Misaki got married.
 Sumire and Kokoro started dating.
 The ESP continued to retroprogress until he turned into an infant and is still cared for by Luna.
 Persona and Nobara had a baby daughter.

References

External links
 Official Hakusensha website 
 Official Tokyopop page
 

Chapters
Gakuen Alice